Froyo may refer to:
Frozen yogurt, a dessert
 Android Froyo, version 2.2 of the mobile operating system